James Henry Strauss Jr. is an American biologist who is the Ethel Wilson Bowles and Robert Bowles Professor of Biology, Emeritus, at the California Institute of Technology.

References

Year of birth missing (living people)
Living people
Fellows of the American Association for the Advancement of Science
California Institute of Technology faculty
21st-century American biologists
California Institute of Technology alumni